The Humble Administrator's Garden is a collection of poetry written by Vikram Seth. It is his first collection, published in 1985.

Sections
The book has three sections, each containing works on a geography of Seth's life. The first section, titled Wutong, is inspired by his years of study and travel in China. Neem, the second section, has poems with themes from his native India, and the last is Live-Oak, with California-based topics.

Contents
Wutong
A Little Night Music
The Master-of-Nets Garden
The Humble Administrator's Garden
The North Temple Tower
The Gentle Waves Pavilion
The Tarrying Garden
The Great Confucian Temple, Suzhou
Nanjing Night
Evening Wheat
The Accountant's House
Research in Jiangsu Province
From a Traveller
A Little Distance
A Hangzhou Garden
From an "East is Red" Steamer
Neem
Profiting
The They
The Comfortable Classes at Work and Play
The Gift
Homeless
From the BaburNama: Memoirs of Babur, First Moghul Emperor of India
Live-Oak
Curious Mishaps
Song: "Coast Starlight"
From California
Song: "Waiting"
Between Storms
And Some Have Madness Thrust Upon Them
Spring of Content
Moonlight
Abalone Soup
Love and Work
Ceasing upon the Midnight
Unclaimed

1985 poetry books
Indian English poetry collections
Poetry by Vikram Seth